Stephan Rose is a boxer from Guyana who participated in the 1991 Pan American Games. He won the bronze medal in boxing in the Men's Flyweight division (less than 51 kg in weight).

References

External links
 

Year of birth missing (living people)
Living people
Flyweight boxers
Sportspeople from Georgetown, Guyana
Boxers at the 1991 Pan American Games
Pan American Games bronze medalists for Guyana
Guyanese male boxers
Pan American Games medalists in boxing
Medalists at the 1991 Pan American Games